Bob and Mike Bryan were the defending champions, but lost to Mahesh Bhupathi and Leander Paes in the semifinals.

Mahesh Bhupathi and Leander Paes won the title, defeating Michaël Llodra and Nenad Zimonjić 7–6(7–4), 7–6(7–2) in the final.

Seeds

Draw

Finals

Top half

Bottom half

References
Main Draw

Western and Southern Open Doubles
2011 Western & Southern Open